Eugène Urbany (born 13 July 1957) is a Luxembourgian former professional racing cyclist. He rode in three editions of the Tour de France and one edition of the Vuelta a España.

References

External links

1957 births
Living people
Luxembourgian male cyclists
People from Dudelange